The Columbus Crew is an American professional soccer club based in Columbus, Ohio. The Crew competes in Major League Soccer (MLS) as a member of the league's Eastern Conference and began play in 1996 as one of the 10 charter clubs of the league. The team is currently operated by an ownership group led by the Haslam family (also owners of the Cleveland Browns and Pilot Corporation) and former team physician Pete Edwards. The Haslam/Edwards group is the third ownership group in club history.

The franchise was founded in 1994. Its stadium is Lower.com Field, opened in 2021. From 1999 to 2021, the Crew played home games at Historic Crew Stadium (formerly Mapfre Stadium and Columbus Crew Stadium), the first soccer-specific stadium built for an MLS team, with a seating capacity of 19,968 as of the 2015 season. From 1996 to 1998, the Crew played its home games at Ohio Stadium on the campus of Ohio State University. In 2014, the team set club attendance records for both most cumulative attendance and most sellouts.

The Crew have won six major trophies: the MLS Cup in 2008 and 2020; the Supporters' Shield in 2004, 2008, and 2009; and the 2002 U.S. Open Cup. The Crew have qualified for the CONCACAF Champions League (or its predecessor, the CONCACAF Champions' Cup) four times, reaching the quarter-finals on the first three occasions. In 2021, the club won their first continental trophy by winning the Campeones Cup.

History

The beginning (1994–1998)

On June 15, 1994, Major League Soccer announced that Columbus, Ohio, would be home to one of the ten founding members of the new top flight North American professional soccer league. Columbus had promised construction of a soccer-specific stadium and had sold over 12,000 season ticket deposits. The team was tentatively named the Columbus Eclipse in its application to the league, as a solar eclipse had passed over the city after reaching the league's 10,000-deposit minimum, but it was eventually renamed the Crew.

MLS investor Lamar Hunt, and his son Clark became the owners of both the Columbus Crew and Kansas City Wizards in 1996. The first players for the Crew were South African national team veteran Doctor Khumalo, by assignment, and Brian McBride. McBride was selected as the first overall pick in MLS's first draft in 1996. Former U.S. National Team coach Timo Liekoski would be the team's head coach for its first season.

The Crew played their first game on April 13, 1996, in front of a home crowd of 25,266 in Ohio Stadium against D.C. United and won 4–0. Columbus would struggle, however, winning only 5 of their next 21 games. After the 6–16 start, Tom Fitzgerald replaced head coach Liekoski. The Crew, under Fitzgerald, won 9 of their last 10 games to finish fourth in the Eastern Conference. They went on to lose in the conference playoff semi-finals.

The Black & Gold finished 15–17 in both 1997 and 1998, which put them in third and fourth place, respectively, in the Eastern Conference. Each season ended with losses in the Conference Finals to D.C. United. The Crew reached the 1998 U.S. Open Cup Final, however, the match was postponed due to a hurricane and controversially relocated from Virginia Beach to Soldier Field in Chicago then the home of Chicago Fire, who won the match 2–1 after extra time. Stern John, in his first of two seasons with Columbus, was the 1998 scoring champion, amassing 26 goals and 5 assists.

A new home (1999–2003)
Columbus's 1999 season began with the opening of Columbus Crew Stadium, the first soccer-specific stadium in the United States. Columbus won their first game in the stadium, 2–0, against New England Revolution in front of a sell-out crowd of 24,741. Columbus would finish in second place at 19–13, but would lose in the conference finals to D.C. United for the third straight season. The 1999 season was the last for Stern John who scored 52 goals in 65 games for the club. The team had the lowest goals against average in the Eastern Conference, and Mark Dougherty became the first goalkeeper in league history to record 50 wins, with a 4–2 win over the MetroStars on August 18, 1999, at Giants Stadium.

Dante Washington was acquired from the Dallas Burn to replace John, but his 13 goals in 2000 was not enough to propel the Crew to the playoffs. For the first time, Columbus failed to reach the postseason. Columbus got off to a slow 1–3–2 start in 2001, which led to the replacement of coach Tom Fitzgerald.  Fitzgerald, who had coached 161 of the Crew's first 183 MLS matches over parts of six seasons between 1996 and 2001, was replaced by Greg Andrulis.  Andrulis would lead the Black & Gold to a 2nd-place finish in 2001 but the team was ousted from the playoffs in the league quarterfinals.

In 2002, Columbus would win the U.S. Open Cup for the first time in team history. They advanced to the finals by beating the Richmond Kickers, MetroStars, and Kansas City Wizards. In the final, they beat LA Galaxy, who had just won the MLS Cup earlier in the week. Freddy García scored the only goal and keeper Jon Busch posted the shutout in Columbus's 1–0 win. It was the first championship in team history. The Crew finished 11–12–5 in the regular season and finished in a tie for first place. They lost in the league semi-finals to New England. Kyle Martino won rookie of the year in 2002, a first for the Crew. By winning the 2002 U.S. Open Cup, Columbus received a bid to play in the 2003 CONCACAF Champions' Cup. They advanced to the second round by beating Árabe Unido 4–2 on aggregate in the first round before losing to Monarcas Morelia, 6–2. McBride would play his final season with Columbus in 2003 before joining Fulham of the Premier League.

Transitions (2004–2006)
With the departure of Brian McBride, Columbus added Robin Fraser and Simon Elliott to the club.  These additions proved to be vital as Fraser went on to win the Defender of the Year award in 2004. The Crew set a franchise record for points, 49, by going 12–5–13, thanks in part to an 18-game unbeaten streak (8–0–10) to end the season. Despite winning the Supporters' Shield for best record in the league, the club would be eliminated from the MLS Cup in the Eastern Conference semi-finals. In his last season for the Black & Gold, Jeff Cunningham scored his 62nd goal, which tied him with McBride for the franchise record.

Over both of the next two seasons, Columbus battled injuries to several players and struggled to win many games. Despite winning the MLS Coach of the Year Award in 2004, Andrulis was replaced on an interim basis by Robert Warzycha midway through the 2005 season. After missing playoffs in the 2005 season, the club would hire former L.A. Galaxy and UCLA head coach Sigi Schmid. Schmid had won an MLS Cup and U.S. Open Championship in his six seasons with Galaxy. Warzycha remained on staff under Schmid. In 2006, the Crew went on a 13-game winless streak (0–7–6) between June 10 and August 19. The season ended on a tragic note when team founder and owner Lamar Hunt died on December 14, 2006.

Around this time, Columbus Crew supporters began using the term "Massive" to describe the club and city, at first ironically, but then as a term of pride and endearment of the club that continuously fought the odds.

The Barros Schelotto era (2007–2010)

The 2007 season in Major League Soccer started with news that global icon David Beckham signed with the LA Galaxy. The Crew followed suit by signing Guillermo Barros Schelotto on April 19, 2007. Columbus also signed forward Alejandro Moreno to bolster its attack. Even with these new players, the Crew still missed the playoffs in 2007.

In 2008, the Crew won its first MLS Cup. Led by Barros Schelotto, who scored seven goals and had 19 assists and won the MLS Most Valuable Player Award, the team also won its second Supporters' Shield.  After going 17–7–6 in the regular season, the Black & Gold won playoff games against Kansas City and Chicago Fire before beating the New York Red Bulls 3–1 in the final. Chad Marshall won MLS Defender of the Year award, and Sigi Schmid won Coach of the Year.

After the 2008 season, Sigi Schmid left Columbus to coach Seattle Sounders FC, and the team named former player and assistant coach Robert Warzycha head coach. In 2009, Barros Schelotto was rewarded with the honor of becoming the franchise's first Designated Player. The club went 13–7–10 in the regular season, good enough for 49 points and their second consecutive Supporters' Shield. The Crew was eliminated by Real Salt Lake in the two-legged Eastern Conference semi-finals, 4–2 on aggregate. Chad Marshall won his second consecutive MLS Defender of the Year award.

Columbus started the 2010 season in the CONCACAF Champions League. They reached the quarterfinals but lost to Toluca in March. The club finished the season 14–8–8 but lost in the quarterfinals of the MLS Cup playoffs to the Colorado Rapids. The Crew lost 2–1 in the 2010 U.S. Open Cup Final at Qwest Field, home of Seattle Sounders FC.

Warzycha's Final Years (2011–2013)
In 2011, the Crew finished ninth in the league at 13–13–8 and lost in the wild card round of the playoffs to the Colorado Rapids.

In 2012, the club finished sixth in the Eastern Conference with a 15–12–7 record. They would narrowly miss the playoffs.

On September 2, 2013, the Crew parted ways with Head Coach Robert Warzycha after an embarrassing home loss to the Seattle Sounders, combined with a highly frustrated fanbase. Brian Bliss, the Crew's technical director, took over as interim head coach. This effectively ended his stay with the club since 1996, when he joined the club as a player.

The Precourt era (2013–2018)
On July 30, 2013, Anthony Precourt became the second investor-operator in the history of the club. Precourt upgraded portions of Crew Stadium, as well as evolving the team's brand in a way that identified with the city of Columbus, all within his first 15 months with the club.

On November 6, 2013, Precourt announced that Gregg Berhalter would be the club's new head coach. Berhalter also became the first sporting director in club history.

The 2014 season saw Columbus return to the postseason for the first time since 2011. Under Berhalter, the Crew finished the year 14–10–10, good enough for the third seed in the Eastern Conference of the MLS Cup Playoffs.

The Crew also sent two of its players to the 2014 FIFA World Cup, center back Giancarlo González and left back Waylon Francis, who both represented Costa Rica during the tournament. Gonzalez was hailed for his performance, being named to ESPN's Best XI of the group stage.

Berhalter was nominated for 2014 MLS Head Coach of the Year. Likewise, goalkeeper Steve Clark was nominated for 2014 Goalkeeper of the Year and Michael Parkhurst won the Individual Fair Play Award for the third time.

Off the field, the Black & Gold announced sports industry veteran Andy Loughnane as its new President of Business Operations on August 16, 2014. 
 The team set the all-time attendance record and sellout record for a single season at Crew Stadium. The combination of the club's on-field success and off-field resurgence capped a successful full first year for Precourt and Berhalter.

On October 8, 2014, the Precourt ownership changed the name and logo of the club, changing the name from "Columbus Crew" to "Columbus Crew SC".

The beginning of the 2015 season started in late 2014 with the return of Kei Kamara. Kamara proved to be beneficial as he scored 22 regular season goals and 4 playoff goals. Along with Kamara, Ethan Finlay and Waylon Francis received spots in the MLS All-Star game versus English Premier League club Tottenham Hotspur. On September 26, 2015, Crew SC hosted their largest sellout crowd since 2008 with an announced attendance of 22,719. Crew SC came into the playoffs with a bye in the first round after securing second place in the Eastern Conference. Following the Eastern Conference semi-final and final match-ups, Crew SC played host to the Portland Timbers in the 2015 MLS Cup Final. This was the club's second-ever MLS Cup Final appearance after the 2008 MLS Cup championship. The Crew was upset by the Portland Timbers at home following the 2–1 loss. All three goals were scored in the first half including the lone Crew SC goal scored by Kamara. Kamara was nominated for the Landon Donovan MLS MVP Award. Kamara was also nominated for and won the MLS WORKS Humanitarian of the Year Award. Wil Trapp was nominated for the MLS Comeback Player of the Year Award.

Proposed relocation to Austin.

On October 17, 2017, Precourt announced intentions to relocate the franchise to Austin, Texas if a downtown stadium could not be secured in Columbus. Following the news, fans and supporters of the club began a campaign and movement known as #SaveTheCrew. Many had been present in the city's council building on behalf of the cause. Later in the month, it was revealed that Precourt had a clause in his purchase of the club that would allow him to relocate the franchise, but only to Austin.

On November 15, 2017, Precourt and MLS commissioner Don Garber met with Columbus mayor Andrew Ginther and civic and business leaders about the Crew's future in Columbus. After the meeting, both sides issued press releases detailing the meeting. Per the delegation from Columbus, Precourt and MLS refused to take the relocation threat off the table. Per Precourt and MLS, Columbus leaders did not present any plan for a downtown stadium. On the issue, the mayor stated it was "obvious that Don Garber nor PSV (Precourt Sports Ventures) had any commitment for the team to stay in Columbus".

In the annual state of the league conference, commissioner Garber addressed more on the potential move. He had stated the difficulties there has been present with the market over the years. Discussing in 2008, when the league began its initiative to end having ownership groups owning multiple franchises in the league, there was no success in finding a local ownership group in the market of Columbus, with an interested group wanting to purchase the team but with a very low value. It was then when the league's executives hired a different company banker and expanded its search regionally where Anthony Precourt was involved. Garber stated that had Precourt not acquired the club, there was a possibility that Columbus would have ceased operations and ultimately folded. As to why the issues were not stated publicly, Don Garber stated that the league is a "private business" and what's been happening has been seen in other major sport leagues in the country.

On March 5, 2018, Ohio attorney general Mike DeWine and the city of Columbus filed a lawsuit against Precourt, citing a 1996 state law that prevents sports teams that benefited from public facilities or financial assistance from relocating to another city without a six-month notice and attempting to sell the team to a local ownership group. The bill was originally passed after the controversial relocation of the Cleveland Browns to Baltimore.

Haslam era and second MLS Cup (2018–present)

On October 12, 2018, the owner of the Cleveland Browns, Jimmy Haslam, released a statement stating he was in the process of buying the Crew, along with other local groups. MLS later released a statement stating their willingness to keep the Crew in Columbus, and that Precourt will get the rights to start a team in Austin if the deal goes through. On January 1, 2019, control of the Crew franchise was officially transferred to the Haslam family and longtime team physician Dr. Pete Edwards, who took full ownership of the club after reaching a deal with Precourt Sports Ventures LLC. The new ownership group also quickly announced that they would be building a new stadium for the Crew in the Arena District of downtown Columbus.

The team then hired Tim Bezbatchenko as president from Toronto FC and Caleb Porter, previously with the Portland Timbers, as their new coach for the 2019 season. The 2019 season was a forgettable one as the Crew dealt with injuries throughout the season.

Before the start of the 2020 MLS season, the Crew made two major signings, bringing in new designated player Lucas Zelarayán and midfielder Darlington Nagbe. The team started out the season well, winning their group in the MLS is Back Tournament before going out in the round of 16 and finishing in third place in the Eastern conference and fourth place overall. After making a run in the playoffs, the Crew won their second MLS Cup just two years into the Haslam era, defeating Seattle Sounders FC 3–0 at Mapfre Stadium on December 12, 2020, in MLS Cup 2020.

Weeks into the 2021 season, the franchise announced they would now be known as Columbus SC, using "Columbus Crew" and "The Crew" in informal instances. The rebrand received strongly negative reception from supporters of the team. A statement by the Nordecke claimed that "neither the Nordecke nor any Crew Supporters Group was involved at any time with the conception, development, or design of the rebrand. The Board was only shown the rebrand in the last few days, and it was presented to us as a completed product with no chance for input." The logo was further criticized as generic and harming the team's identity. This was done despite promises of fan involvement by team president Tim Bezbatchenko, which led to him being labeled as a "traitor". A petition was created on change.org to restore the team's name. Other observers noted that the rebrand was part of a similar trend in MLS teams to emulate European naming conventions, and was compared to the rebranding of Chicago Fire FC two years earlier. On May 17, 2021, in response to the backlash surrounding the rebrand, the franchise announced that "Columbus Crew" would remain as their official name and that the new logo would be modified accordingly.  In addition, the "SC" was dropped from the brand, with the team's name being simply the "Columbus Crew" once again.

They recorded their first win at Lower.com Field on July 17, 2021.

Colors and badge

The official colors of the Crew are black and gold. Columbus's usual primary jersey is predominately bright yellow with black trim and has been nicknamed the "banana kit" or "canary kit" by fans.

The alternate uniform has historically been black. In the latter part of the 2000s, The Crew began shifting more towards a white uniform with yellow and black trim or stripes. Even so, the away uniforms are seldom worn by The Crew due to the strong favor shown to the traditional home uniform; and also due to the fact that the historically black jerseys compound the summer heat in the United States climate. For the 2015 season, the Crew returned to a black jersey for its alternate uniform.

Prior to the initial MLS season, a citywide public contest was created to decide the name for the team, the very first entry was a hit, and the Columbus Crew was born.

The club badge from 1996 to 2014 was unique amongst MLS teams in that it featured people, containing three silhouetted males wearing construction hats beneath a stylized "Crew" wordmark. The logo was intended to represent a crew of hard-working people, much like the hard-working, blue collar image the city of Columbus cultivates.

Citing a disconnect between what the crest stood for and the 21st-century identity of the city of Columbus, owner Anthony Precourt initiated a rebrand upon assuming ownership in 2013. Precourt said that Columbus was no longer a true blue collar town, and that the industrial/manufacturing motif was no longer representative. In fact, Columbus had grown into a 21st-century city and become much more "dynamic and diverse".

On October 8, 2014, the Crew unveiled a new badge. The new circular-shaped badge features the club's classic black and gold colors, a minimized original crest with "96" overlaid on top, and the black and gold checkerboard pattern predominantly seen on flags waving in the Nordecke. A great deal of symbolism was packed into the new badge. The horizontal stripes are representative of the ten original MLS franchises, and the shield is an homage to the club's original badge with the 96 representing 1996 – the club's first year in competition. The inset "O" in the badge mimics the same shape found in Ohio state flag, a nod to Columbus's role as the state's capital city. Finally, as a significant point of pride for the city of Columbus, "Columbus" was added to the new badge, along with "SC" to further define the brand more accurately as a soccer club.

The club's nickname, the Crew, also evolved from its original meaning as a hard-working construction crew to a new, more relevant one as "a tight-knit group of people who come together to share a passion for our club and the sport of soccer". The nickname, Crew, is now meant to symbolize a unique brand of family and friendship between the club, the fans and the communities who unite to embrace and celebrate the authenticity and heritage of the sport. With the rebrand, the club also identified three brand pillars: original, energetic, and authentically Columbus, in an effort to celebrate its history as a team of firsts – first club in Major League Soccer, first soccer-specific stadium, first major professional championship for Columbus – its youthful, passionate energy, as well as Columbus's young, progressive culture.

Uniform history

Stadium

On May 15, 1999, the Crew opened Columbus Crew Stadium, the first soccer-specific stadium in Major League Soccer, as the Crew beat the New England Revolution 2–0 before a sold-out crowd of 24,741. It has been the model stadium for the rest of the league, and one of the stadiums used by the United States national team in World Cup qualifying. In 2015, the naming rights for the stadium were purchased by Madrid-based insurance company Mapfre.

Previously, the Columbus Crew played their home games at the 102,000-capacity Ohio Stadium on the campus of the Ohio State University, home of the Ohio State Buckeyes college football team. They ended with a 33–20 record while playing there.

The team has also played U.S. Open Cup games at two other stadiums: two games in 2005 and 2016 at the Jesse Owens Memorial Stadium, also owned by the Ohio State University and home of the OSU soccer teams; and one in 2014 at the FirstEnergy Stadium–Cub Cadet Field on the campus of the University of Akron in Akron, Ohio.

As part of the new ownership proposal for the Crew unveiled in 2018, the club announced plans to build a new stadium in the Arena District of Downtown Columbus. The new stadium would cost $230 million and be located at the center of the Confluence Village neighborhood, a mixed-use development with residential and commercial buildings. It would seat 20,000 spectators and include 30 suites and 1,900 club seats. In 2020, a new authority took ownership of Mapfre Stadium, soon renamed Historic Crew Stadium, and its adjacent city sports park, with the team continuing to control that venue in terms of its use as a training facility. The training facility, the OhioHealth Performance Center, opened in June 2021. The new stadium had its groundbreaking ceremony in 2019 and was completed in mid-2021. On June 15, 2021, the new stadium was named Lower.com Field via a sponsorship deal with Columbus-based online real estate company Lower.com, and the Crew's first game there was on July 3 against the New England Revolution.

Revenue and profitability
Having lost money in 2011, in 2012 the Crew identified three financial goals with the aim of achieving financial stability. First, the team wanted a different jersey sponsor, which it achieved when they reached a deal with Barbasol. Second, the team wanted to sell naming rights to Columbus Crew Stadium, hoping for $15 million over 10 years. Third, the Crew had announced in September 2011 that it aimed to increase season-ticket sales from its current levels (later revealed to be 4,000) to 10,000.  By November 2012, Crew season tickets were at 6,000, and by August 2013, the Crew had surpassed 7,000 season ticket holders.

Under Precourt Sports Ventures, Anthony Precourt, and Andy Loughnane, the Crew's goals have shifted from exclusively focusing on season ticket sales to selling out MAPFRE Stadium. In 2014, the club set all-time stadium attendance records for highest overall attendance and most sellouts in one season. Loughnane confirmed that the club was trending to increase its season ticket membership by 1,000 members per year and also stated his intent for the club to assimilate into the corporate community and fan culture, adding that he believes this transformation is happening rapidly. On March 3, 2015, the Crew announced that they had agreed to a multimillion-dollar stadium naming rights partnership with MAPFRE Insurance, a first for the stadium. In 2015, the Crew and EAS Sports Nutrition agreed to a naming rights deal for its training facilities. Merchandise sales grew double digits since the previous year, as did food and beverage sales. It was also announced that the club gained over 1,000 new season ticket members from the previous year.

Sponsorship
Mars' Snickers chocolate bar was the Crew's first uniform sponsor, on a five-year, $6 million deal that lasted from 1996 to 2000. From 2002 to 2004 Pepsi was the team's shirt sponsor. Glidden was the Crew's shirt sponsor from 2008 to 2010, a deal worth $1 million per year. In early 2012, they signed a five-year deal with Barbasol, which is based in Dublin, Ohio, for $900,000 annually

In late February 2017, Columbus Crew SC signed a three-year deal with Acura, making the company the Official Jersey Partner and the Official Automotive Partner of the team. At the time, The deal was also the largest annual commercial transaction in club history, at $1.8 million a year.

On February 27, 2020, the Crew announced that they had signed a multi-year deal with Columbus-based insurance company Nationwide. Although terms of the deal were not disclosed, it was reported that the annual value is "more than $3 million."

There was no jersey sponsor in 2001, 2005–2007 and 2011.

Club culture

Supporters and Nordecke

Before the 2008 season, the Columbus Crew front office demolished the north stands where the most ardent of Crew supporters stood, in order to build a stage that would provide additional revenue by facilitating concerts and other events. Prior to this, the team's three supporters' groups (Crew Supporters Union, Hudson Street Hooligans, and La Turbina Amarilla) sat apart because of differences between the groups ranging from age to ethnicity. The building of the stage forced the groups to come together into the north corner of the stadium, forming one large block of vocal supporters. The three groups formed the Nordecke, which is German for "north corner", celebrating the city's German heritage. In 2006 a large contingency of fans from the Nordecke began traveling together to support the Crew during their away campaigns. In late 2009/early 2010, the term "NorOnTour" grew popular on social networking, to describe the frequent fan traveling support.

Mascot
Columbus Crew's first mascot was "Crew Cat", who was the franchise's mascot for almost 20 years. Columbus's official mascot is "S.C", the son of "Crew Cat" that was introduced for the 2015 MLS season. As new ownership was employed in the 2019 season, the older "Crew Cat" returned and attends games alongside S.C.

Rivalries
The Crew has a rivalry with the Chicago Fire. Columbus is roughly a six-hour drive away from Chicago. Due to the relatively close proximity of the two cities, it is not uncommon for supporters of both teams to make the trip to support their club in matches between the two. In the 2008 season, Columbus defeated Chicago in the Eastern Conference Championship match. In 1998, Chicago defeated Columbus for the Lamar Hunt U.S. Open Cup.

The Crew also plays for two rivalry cups during the regular season. One of the series is with Toronto FC for the Trillium Cup, due to the close proximity of the cities. The Crew also contests FC Dallas for the Lamar Hunt Pioneer Cup. This trophy was created due to Lamar Hunt being the owner of both teams until his death.

As a lower-division club, FC Cincinnati supporters claimed the Crew as a rival, although some Columbus supporters did not consider the former USL team a rival. The two sides first met in a 2017 Lamar Hunt U.S. Open Cup match in front of 30,000 spectators, the largest non-final crowd for an Open Cup fixture. The match ended in a 1-0 win for FC Cincinnati  As Cincinnati moved to the league, the rivalry became solidified in league lore; this derby is known as the Hell is Real Derby, based on a Christian billboard along I-71 between Columbus and Cincinnati.

Broadcasting
In 2016, Crew SC games aired on TWC Sports Channel (now Spectrum Sports), simulcast on Sinclair Broadcast Group-operated stations in Columbus. The majority of games aired on The CW affiliate WWHO, and selected games also aired on WSYX, WTTE, and WSYX's MyNetworkTV subchannel. Dwight Burgess and Neil Sika served as co-hosts.

In 2019, the team reached a deal with Fox Sports Ohio (now known as Bally Sports Ohio), placing all matches on either it or secondary channel Bally Sports Great Lakes.

On March 1, 2019, the team announced English-language radio broadcasts would be on 97.1 WBNS-FM with Chris Doran as the dedicated audio broadcaster. Spanish radio broadcast was also announced for ColumbusCrewSC.com and Juan Valladares as the broadcaster 

On February 21, 2020, the team announced Jordan Angeli replaced Dwight Burgess, becoming the first woman broadcaster in the club's history.

With every MLS game available on Apple TV via their rights deal in 2023, Crew games will be broadcast almost exclusively on this service, with exceptions for certain national linear television broadcast partners.

Players and staff

Current roster

Team management
{|class="wikitable"
|-
!style="background:#FEDD00; color:#000; border:2px solid #000;" scope="col" colspan="2"|Front office
|-

|-
!style="background:#FEDD00; color:#000; border:2px solid #000;" scope="col" colspan="2"|Coaching staff
|-

|- 
!style="background:#FEDD00; color:#000; border:2px solid #000;" scope="col" colspan="2"|Crew Academy
|-

Head coach history

The Crew have had eight different head coaches since joining the league in 1996. Timo Liekoski, the only Finnish head coach in MLS history, was the first head coach in 1996, but started 6–16 and was fired midseason to be replaced by Tom Fitzgerald. Sigi Schmid managed the team for three seasons (2006–08). Robert Warzycha was the head coach twice, the first time on an interim basis prior to Schmid's arrival and then immediately after Schmid left until September 2, 2013, when he was fired and Brian Bliss became the interim coach. On November 16, 2013, it was announced that Gregg Berhalter would become the head coach as well as the first sporting director in club history. After Berhalter left to take over as coach of the United States men's national soccer team, Columbus hired Caleb Porter, who had previously been the head coach of the Portland Timbers in MLS and the Akron Zips men's soccer team in the NCAA.

Fitzgerald and Warzycha are tied for the all-time leader in regular season wins (70).

General manager and sporting director history

Player development

Columbus Crew 2 
On June 21, 2021, Major League Soccer announced the formation of a new professional league, which would act as a developmental program for its clubs. The new league, which was unveiled on December 6, 2021, would be named MLS Next Pro and the Crew's team would be Columbus Crew 2. The league and club compete at the Division III level. With the exception of special occasions such as championship matches, all home games take place at Historic Crew Stadium. Fans regularly refer to Columbus Crew 2 by their unofficial nickname, the Capybaras.

Academy 
The Columbus Crew Academy fields four non-professional teams. There are U15, U17, and U19 clubs. The Crew has signed 15 alumni to First-team MLS contracts, of which 11 have appeared in a regular-season Crew match. Alumnus Wil Trapp was the first player in MLS history to be a homegrown captain.

Notable alumni include Wil Trapp, Aboubacar Keita, Aidan Morris, Isaiah Parente, and Juan Castilla.

The Crew formed a partnership with the Michigan Wolves youth soccer club in 2011, later extending the partnership another two years in 2014.

Honors

National
 MLS Cup
 Champions (2): 2008, 2020
 Supporters Shield
 Champions (3): 2004, 2008, 2009
 U.S. Open Cup
 Champions (1): 2002

Individual Club Awards 
MLS Fair Play Award (6): 1997, 1999, 2004, 2007, 2016, 2021

Continental
 Campeones Cup
 Champions (1): 2021

Record

Year-by-year

This is a partial list of the last five seasons completed by the Crew. For the full season-by-season history, see List of Columbus Crew seasons.

1. Avg. attendance include statistics from league matches only.
2. Top goalscorer(s) includes all goals scored in League, MLS Cup Playoffs, U.S. Open Cup, MLS is Back Tournament, CONCACAF Champions League, FIFA Club World Cup, and other competitive continental matches.

International tournaments

Columbus holds a 13–6–3 all-time record in international friendlies.

Player records

Appearances

Goals

Assists

Shutouts

Captains

Average attendance
Sources:

References

External links

 

 
Association football clubs established in 1996
Soccer clubs in Columbus, Ohio
Sports teams in Columbus, Ohio
1996 establishments in Ohio
Major League Soccer teams
Jimmy Haslam
U.S. Open Cup winners
Soccer clubs in Ohio
2019 mergers and acquisitions